Parliamentary elections were held in Portugal on 12 July 1874.

Results

References

1874
1874 elections in Europe
1874 in Portugal
July 1874 events